The Governor of Stockholm was the head of the Office of the Governor of Stockholm (ÖÄ), and as such he was the highest Swedish State official overseeing the affairs in the City of Stockholm between 1634 and 1967. The Governor was the equivalent in Stockholm of a county governor elsewhere in Sweden.

The Governor was appointed by and reported to the King in Council. The Office of the Governor of Stockholm was instituted by the Instrument of Government of 1634, written by Lord High Chancellor Axel Oxenstierna, which uniformly delineated the civil state administration of Sweden into Counties and the Office of the Governor of Stockholm.

While Stockholm County was established in 1714, the city itself was not included until 1968, when the Office of the Governor of Stockholm was abolished and the duties of it was handed over to the Governor of Stockholm County.

List of governors

See also

Counties of Sweden
County Governors of Sweden
Governor-General in the Swedish Realm
Marshal of the Realm

Footnotes

References

 
Lists of county governors of Sweden
1634 establishments in Sweden
1967 disestablishments in Sweden
Heads of Swedish State agencies